Ilyas Gadit (born 1946) is associated with Gujrati Journalism for over four decades and has been the editor of Gujrati evening paper "Watan" for almost a decade.

He is the editor of Gujrati evening paper Watan' and a noted writer and translator.

See also
List of Pakistani journalists
Radio Pakistan

References

External links
Daily Dawn

Living people
Pakistani male journalists
1946 births
Place of birth missing (living people)